Ronaldo Cunha Lima (18 March 1936 – 7 July 2012) was a Brazilian poet and politician. He served as the Governor of Paraíba from 1991 to 1994.

Early life 
Cunha Lima was born on 18 March 1936, in Guarabira, Brazil. He moved with his family to the city of Campina Grande, in Brazil's northeast, when he was young. He received a legal from the Federal University of Paraíba, serving as Vice President of a political, student organization called Centro Estudantil Campinense while attending the university.

Political career 
A notorious incident occurred while Cunha Lima was Governor, following an incident where former Governor Tarcísio Burity accused Cunha Lima's son Cássio Cunha Lima of corruption with respect to siphoning off money to be used for drought relief.  On 5 November 1993, Governor Cunha Lima entered the Gulliver Restaurant in João Pessoa and shot his predecessor, former Governor Burity, twice while Burity was eating.  Burity spent days in a coma, but eventually recovered.  After hours of being jailed, Cunha Lima was greeted on his balcony by a large crowd of fans that supported him defending his family's honor.  A few days after the shooting, the city council of Campina Grande presented Cunha Lima with a medal of merit.

Death 
Cunha Lima died of complications from lung cancer at his family's home in João Pessoa, Brazil, on 7 July 2012, at the age of 76. A public viewing was held at the Palácio da Redenção. He was buried in the Monte Santo cemetery. Survivors included his son, Senator Cássio Cunha Lima.

References

1936 births
2012 deaths
Governors of Paraíba
Brazilian male poets
Brazilian Democratic Movement politicians
Brazilian Social Democracy Party politicians
People from João Pessoa, Paraíba
People from Paraíba
Deaths from liver cancer
Deaths from cancer in Paraíba
20th-century Brazilian poets
20th-century Brazilian male writers